Samuel Farber (November 16, 1924 – June 16, 2013) was an American industrial designer and businessman. 

Farber and his son, John Farber, co-founded OXO, a manufacturer of kitchen utensils and housewares. Farber is credited with revolutionizing the kitchen utensil industry by developing and introducing a line of utensils with plastic-coated black handles through OXO. While more expensive than traditional utensils, the new soft, black handled utensils proved to be a success with consumers.

Early life
Sam Farber was born on November 16, 1924, in New York City, though he was raised in nearby Yonkers, New York. His father, Louis Farber, established Farber Brothers, which sold serving ware. His uncle, Simon Farber, founded Farberware, which manufactures kitchen appliances and cookware.

Farber served in North Africa and Turkey during World War II as a member of the Army Air Forces. He received a bachelor's degree in economics from Harvard University in 1946.

Career

Copco
In 1960, Farber founded Copco, which manufactured enamel-coated, cast iron cookware. He sold Copco in 1982, largely retiring from the industry at the time of the sale.

OXO
Farber founded OXO as a result of improvements he made to an everyday vegetable peeler. While vacationing in a rented home in southern France, his wife, Betsy Farber, who suffered from arthritis, was trying to peel apples, which proved difficult using a peeler with a standard design. The difficulties presented by available peelers (and their handles) sparked an idea for Sam for a more inclusive design. He and his son, John, hired Smart Design, an industrial design firm based in New York City, with whom they created a new product line of kitchen utensils fitted with soft plastic-coated black handles, which made them easier to hold and utilize, and more aesthetically appealing than other utensils.

Farber unveiled the new line at the Gourmet Products Show in San Francisco, California, in 1990. He named his company "OXO" for its "backward, upside-down and vertical graphic symmetry." Farber's OXO products were more expensive than competitors', but the line proved a hit with consumers, who were willing to pay more for the new, easier-to-use utensils.

The Farber family sold OXO to General Housewares Corporation in 1992. OXO is currently owned by Helen of Troy Limited, as of 2013.

Mario Batali products
Sam and John Farber later created a line of products sold by chef Mario Batali.

Boards
An art collector, Farber served on the board of directors for the American Folk Art Museum in Manhattan.

Personal life
He was a longtime resident of Manhattan but lived in Lexington, Massachusetts, during his later years.

Death
Sam Farber died in East Meadow, New York of complications from a fall on June 16, 2013, at the age of 88. He was survived by his second wife, Betsey Wells Kriegsman, whom he married in 1985; his two sons from his first marriage, John Farber and Thomas Farber; two stepchildren, Mark Kriegsman and Sue Kriegsman; four granddaughters; and three step-granddaughters.

References

1924 births
2013 deaths
American industrial designers
American company founders
Harvard College alumni
United States Army Air Forces personnel of World War II
People from Lexington, Massachusetts
People from Manhattan
People from Yonkers, New York
Deaths from falls